Motor Music is an independent record label based in Berlin, Germany providing a wide range of music services including music publication, artists management, producing music for films and business and music advertising. Motor Music was founded in 1994 by Tim Renner as a subsidiary of the music group PolyGram (later Universal Music). Within that period, Motor Music has discovered well-known European pioneering artists for instance Tocotronic, Rammstein, Sportfreunde Stiller, Farmer Boys, Element of Crime and Absolute Beginner. These artists have become a decisive driving force behind the European music scene and the success reflects the interactive correlation between rock music and national recognition in that particular period.

History

Refoundation 
In 2005, 10 years after Motor Music was founded in 1994, the founder Tim Renner and Motor Music left Universal Music Group and re-founded Motor Entertainment. The Motor Music within the Motor Entertainment again operates as an independent label. After leaving Universal Music, Motor Entertainment continues in discovering new artists. The company also started to add other businesses into the music label including publication (e.g. Alice Phoebe Lou, L'aupaire, Sophia, Super700, PeterLicht), artists management (e.g. Max Raabe, Christoph Israel, Malakoff Kowalski, Fargo), and film and advertisement selection (e.g. 102 Boyz, BHZ, Jan Blomqvist, Teenage Mutants, Moonlight Breakfast).

Motor FM 
In February 2005, after leaving Universal Music, Motor Music founded the radio station Motor FM, which began regular broadcasting. The radio emphasized advertising and news-free program mainly regarding German-language music. Besides the broadcast, the radio can also be heard live via the Internet. The radio station is regarded as the new forms of music marketing. In September 2006, Motor TV started to broadcast, a television program was available on IPTV and DVB-T which also focused on German-language music . In 2011, Motor FM changed its name to Flux FM transmitter and currently, both Motor FM and Motor TV have now stopped the business.

Artists and recordings

Artist management 
 Max Raabe
 Christoph Israel
 Malakoff Kowalski
 Fargo

Film and advertisement music selection 
 102 Boyz
 BHZ
 Jan Blomqvist
 Teenage Mutants
 Moonlight Breakfast
 Lex Lugner
 Sparkling
 Pauls Jets
 Tara Nome Doyle

Sub labels 
The sub labels of Motor Music includes Motor, Motor Music Promo, Motor Publishing.

May also appear as Motor Song on some internet music platforms.

Rammstein 

In early 1994, Rammstein began working with manager Emanuel Fialik who later introduced the band to Motor Music recording company in the same year. Motor Music signed the band on January 4, 1995, and it becomes the first label of Rammstein.

Motor Music was responsible for the release of Rammstein’s first three albums: Herzeleid, Sehnsucht and Mutter.

Other artists recorded or published

Rock music

Electronic

Hip Pop

Jazz

See also
 List of record labels

References

American record labels